St. Michael's College School, (also known as St. Michael's, St. Mike's, and SMCS), is an independent, Catholic school for young men in Toronto, Ontario, Canada. Administered by the Basilian Fathers, it is the largest school of its kind in Canada, with an enrolment of approximately 950 students from grades 7 to 12. It is known for its high standard of academics and athletics, notably its ice hockey, football and basketball programs. The hockey program has graduated numerous future National Hockey League ice hockey players. The basketball and football programs have graduated multiple NBA, NFL, and CFL players. St. Michael's College School is the affiliate school of Holy Name of Mary College School, an independent, Catholic all-girls school in Mississauga. St. Michael's was part of the Metropolitan Separate School Board from 1967 to 1985, but has subsequently operated within the Conference of Independent Schools of Ontario Athletic Association.

History
The Congregation of St. Basil (Basilian Fathers) was established as a religious congregation in France in 1822. As a result of the closing of seminaries in France during the French Revolution, two diocesan priests opened a secret school in the mountains of central France.

After several years of operation and a change in the French laws, ten priests serving there openly bound themselves into a religious community. They reasoned that the school, by then located in the nearby city of Annonay, would have a better chance of continuing if it were conducted by a religious congregation that could accept and train new members to continue its operation after the founding fathers’ retirement.

The original members chose St. Basil the Great, a fourth-century teacher, bishop, and doctor of the Church, to be the namesake of the new community.

In the middle of the nineteenth century, the French Basilians came to Canada on an invitation from Bishop de Charbonnel of Toronto. The Bishop saw the need for Catholic schools for the young people of his parishes, especially at the high school level. In his plans to bring Catholic education to more of his people, the Bishop immediately thought of his own education in France. He had been educated at the College of Annonay near Lyon, a school established by the Basilian Fathers.

In September 1852, St. Michael’s College School opened. It quickly outgrew its original facilities in the basement of the Bishop’s Palace on Church Street. In 1856, it moved to Clover Hill, a property donated to the Basilian Fathers by the Honourable John Elmsley. Clover Hill was outside the city at that time, in an area now bounded by Bay, St. Joseph, and St. Mary’s streets. In 1881, St. Michael’s was affiliated with St. Michael's College at the University of Toronto for post secondary education.

The school specifically targeted Irish immigrants. The high school section expanded much more rapidly than the College section. In 1902, a new wing was added to the original building and the high school remained here until 1950.

In the years after World War II, it became apparent that the Bay Street buildings were not equal to the challenge of serving a growing student body. At this point the high school section was separated from the University College. In September 1950, St. Michael’s College School opened its doors  at Bathurst Street and St. Clair Avenue, where it is situated today.

In 1967, St. Michael’s College School entered into partnership with the Metropolitan Separate School Board (known today as the Toronto Catholic District School Board) educating the Board’s students in Grades 9 and 10. This decision made St. Michael’s College School both a public and private school, which lasted for approximately 20 years. In September 1985, the Basilian Fathers decided to refuse provincial aid beyond and return St. Michael’s to its roots as an independent, Catholic high school.

In 1995, a major capital expansion program upgraded the school to include an east wing complete with Science classrooms, a library (Odette Library), music and visual arts facilities, a design and technology facility, a 250-seat lecture hall, and an expanded gymnasium. In September 1998, St. Michael’s College School expanded its academic program to include a Grade 7 and 8 program. The Preparatory school was previously active during the early 1900s.

On September 15, 2002, St. Michael’s College School celebrated its 150th Anniversary.

The school’s athletic stadium was retrofitted in September 2004 to include a state-of-the-art athletic field complete with artificial turf, an electronic scoreboard, stadium lighting, and an air supported dome that covers a third of the field for use during the winter months. The St. Michael's College School Centre for the Arts was the fourth and final phase of this revitalization project. The St. Michael's College School Centre for the Arts opened in April 2010, and hosts annual school stage productions of musicals and dramas in addition to concerts and other events.

In November 2018, police began an investigation after learning of two separate sexual assaults at the school. The school suspended and expelled a number of students. On October 3, 2019, three of the seven students charged pleaded guilty to charges of sexual assault with a weapon and assault with a weapon and were later sentenced to two years probation. On November 2, 2019, the final case concluded in court with a former student being sentenced to two years probation.

Campus 

The school's campus is located at Bathurst Street and St. Clair Avenue at the edge of Toronto's Forest Hill neighbourhood. The main school building was designed by Canadian architect Ernest Cormier and completed in 1950. Its most recognizable features are the distinctive chapel tower and yellow brickwork, similar to Cormier's earlier work at the Université de Montréal.

In the late 1990s, a major expansion programme was undertaken, with two major academic wings and a gymnasium extension added to the original building. The additions contain classrooms tailored to the science, art and music programmes, a substantial lecture hall, several computer laboratories, and a large library. An outdoor courtyard adjacent to the cafeteria overlooked by classrooms is popular for major school events. The school's residence wing, originally built to accommodate boarding students, functioned as a Basilian house until 2008 when it was removed to make room for the school's "state-of-the-art" Centre for the Arts. The $10 million facility was completed in the April 2010.

There are a number of sports facilities located on campus, including the St. Michael's College School Arena. The school's basketball court is named after former vice-principal, teacher, coach, and alumnus Paul Dignan. In 2005, a major overhaul of the stadium was undertaken. Renamed in honour of its benefactor, billionaire alumnus Eugene Melnyk, it features an artificial turf field, a rubberized running track, and lighting for evening events. During the winter, an air supported dome covers part of the field to allow for use year-round.

Athletics 

Over 90 St. Michael's Majors alumni have played in the National Hockey League. From the Majors, there are twelve Hockey Hall of Fame inductees: Bobby Bauer, Turk Broda, Gerry Cheevers, Dick Duff, Tim Horton, Red Kelly, Dave Keon, Ted Lindsay, Frank Mahovlich, Joe Primeau, Murray Costello, and Jim Gregory. Additionally, Hall of Famer Reg Noble played for St. Michael's before the team adopted the Majors name.

The school's flagship hockey team, the Toronto St. Michael's Majors, won the Memorial Cup four times before ceasing operation in 1961. The Majors name was revived as an expansion franchise in the Ontario Hockey League from 1996 to 2012, then sold off to become the Mississauga Steelheads. The school also operates the St. Michael's Buzzers, at the Tier II Junior "A" level. The school was featured on CBC's annual Hockey Day in Canada on January 13, 2007, as the College School was celebrating 100 years of hockey.
The junior and senior football teams are called the Kerry Blues. The Jr. Kerry Blues won their third Ontario Regional Invitational in 2008 (having previously won in 2002 and 2004) In 2008, the Senior Kerry Blues won their seventh Metro Bowl, making the St. Michael's Kerry Blues the most bowl-winning team in Ontario. They have won the Metro Bowl three years in a row. There have been many Kerry Blues Football alumni that have gone on to win the CIAU National Football Championship with their respective universities.  The 1993 Vanier Cup Champion University of Toronto Varsity Blues had several SMCS Alumni: Christopher Tyndorf, Lou Tiro and Peter Woo. National Football League players Glen Young, O.J. Santiago and Mike Labinjo, each of whom have competed in the Super Bowl, played football while attending St. Michael’s.

The school competes in the Basil Bowl against other Basilian high schools.

Notable faculty 
Greg Wojt, former CFL player; St. Michael's coach

Former faculty 
Father David Bauer, Founder of the Canada men's national ice hockey team, inductee into the Hockey Hall of Fame
Michael Colle, Ontario Minister of Citizenship and Immigration
Dr. Michael W. Higgins, president of St. Thomas University; former president of St. Jerome's University
Michael McGowan, English teacher; director of the film Saint Ralph

Notable alumni
St. Michael's alumni include many athletes, politicians and media personalities, some of whom are publicly known on multiple stages.

Academia
Robert J. Birgeneau, Canadian Physicist, the 9th chancellor of University of California, Berkeley, currently Chancellor Emeritus and Chair in Departments of Physics, Materials Science and Engineering and Public Policy, former President of the University of Toronto (2000–2004), former professor at Massachusetts Institute of Technology, Yale University, and University of Oxford
Gregory Kealey, historian on Canada's working class, Professor Emeritus Department of History, vice president (Research) 2001–2021 University of New Brunswick
Joseph Pivato, Ph.D., Professor Emeritus of Literary Studies Athabasca University author of 12 books. His research establish the academic recognition of Italian-Canadian literature.
David Staines, English professor, University of Ottawa; member of the Order of Canada, Medal of Courage, Order of Ontario, Founding member of the jury of the Giller Prize.

Athletes
Professional athletes among alumni, include numerous CFL and NHL players, some of whom are also noted sports coaches.

National Hockey League (NHL) players
Bobby Bauer
Turk Broda
Gerry Cheevers
Andrew Cogliano
Les Costello
Murray Costello, Hockey Hall of Famer
Bill Dineen, coach
Dick Duff
Paul Gardner, coach
Luke Gazdic
Tim Horton, Tim Hortons co-founder
Red Kelly, coach; York West MPP, Canadian Senator
Dave Keon
Michael Liambas
Brett Lindros
Eric Lindros
Ted Lindsay
Frank Mahovlich, Canadian senator
Peter Mahovlich
Cesare Maniago
Craig Mills
Dominic Moore
Steve Moore
Reg Noble
Joe Primeau
Jason Spezza
Tyler Seguin
Chris Tanev
John Jakopin
Matthew Halischuk
Jake Evans
Akil Thomas
Jamie Drysdale

National Football League (NFL) players
Mike Labinjo
O.J. Santiago
Glen Young

Canadian Football League (CFL) players
Nolan MacMillan
Chris Smith
Derek Wiggan
Glen Young
Andrew Martin
Kaion Julien-Grant
Gordon Whyte

National Basketball Association (NBA) players
Leo Rautins, NBA player, Philadelphia 76ers; Canadian national men's basketball team coach; Toronto Raptors broadcaster

Other athletes
Danilo Djuricic, D1 NCAA basketball player for Harvard Crimson
Marcus Carr, D1 NCAA basketball player for Minnesota Golden Gophers 
Duane Notice, professional basketball player for Raptors 905
Justyn Knight, 2017 NCAA DI Men's Cross Country National Champion (Syracuse University), distance runner with Reebok

Business
Robert Deluce, founder, Porter Airlines
Sergio Marchionne, CEO, Fiat Chrysler Automobiles; chair, Maserati, chair, Ferrari; chair (Italy), Council for the United States and Italy
Eugene Melnyk, billionaire, co-founder, Biovail Corporation; owner, Ottawa Senators
Frank Buckley, President of Buckley's cough syrup
Anthony Di Iorio, billionaire Canadian entrepreneur, co-founder of Ethereum, early investor in Bitcoin, founder and CEO of the blockchain company Decentral, first chief digital officer of the Toronto Stock Exchange

Media
Mikey Bustos, entertainer; finalist, Canadian Idol
Jesse Carere, actor
Sergio Di Zio, actor
Michael Enright (honorary diploma recipient), host, CBC Radio
Michael Ontkean, actor
Estanislao Oziewicz,  journalist, The Globe and Mail

Politics
Patrick Brown, Mayor of Brampton; former MPP; former Ontario Leader of the Official Opposition (PCC)
Josh Colle, Toronto City Councillor; Toronto Transit Commission
Michael Colle, Toronto City Councillor; former Minister of Citizenship and Immigration
Stephen Lecce, King—Vaughan MPP, Ontario Minister of Education
Joe Mihevc, Toronto City Councillor
Jaggi Singh, anarchist; activist
Michael Tibollo, Vaughan—Woodbridge MPP

Public Service
Myron Demkiw, Chief of Police of the Toronto Police Service

See also 
Conference of Independent Schools of Ontario Athletic Association

References

External links 

 

Boys' schools in Canada
Catholic secondary schools in Ontario
Catholic elementary schools in Ontario
High schools in Toronto
Private schools in Toronto
Toronto Catholic District School Board
Educational institutions established in 1852
Basilian schools
1852 establishments in Canada
1852 establishments in Ontario